P. Habeeb Mohamed (1899–1963) was an Indian lawyer and the first Muslim judge of the High Court of Travancore.

Early life and family
Habeeb was born in 1899, in Vakkom, into an affluent Muslim family Poonthran. He was the nephew of Vakkom Moulavi, a visionary, social reformer and the founder of Swadeshabhimani newspaper. Habeeb was the first of three children born to Pakeer Mytheen and Mohamed Pathumma. His brother, Mohamed Mytheen was an Islamic scholar and writer. He had one sister: Mariyam Beevi. Habeeb had his early education in Attingal High School, Trivandrum H.H.Maharaja's College, Trivandrum (the present University College), Law College, Trivandrum. He was married to Haleema Beevi, niece of Vakkom Moulavi. They had two daughters. The elder daughter, the late Subaida, was married to Mohamed Ghani, the son of Mohammed Mustafa Sahib, former MLC of Madras. The younger daughter Naseema, was married to the late K. Seethi Mohammed, the only son of the late K.M.Seethi Sahib.

Career
Habeeb was a contemporary of the late K.M.Seethi Sabib (in Law College), who became the Speaker of the Kerala State Legislative Assembly.
He enrolled as an advocate in Trivandrum first. He also worked as a Municif in Trivandrum for six months, before he became the district judge of Trivandrum. Justice Habeeb served as district judge in Kottayam, Kollam, Alappuzha, and Trivandrum. He became judge of the High Court in 1946 and moved his career to Ernakulam. He retired as the judge of the High Court in 1951.

Notable Contribution
Justice Habeeb's notable contribution while in service was his famous judgment on the Absabeevi's case while serving as District Judge of Alleppy. His verdict that Muslim woman had the right to get divorced from her husband was remarkable at a time when the Islamic Sharia was still a matter of controversy in respect of its alleged bias against women.

Later years and death
After retiring from his judicial career in 1951, he became active in the Muslim League for some time. He died in 1963.

See also
 Vakkom Moulavi
 Vakkom Majeed

References

1899 births
1963 deaths
20th-century Indian judges
20th-century Indian Muslims
People from Thiruvananthapuram district
People of the Kingdom of Travancore
Members of the Kerala Legislative Assembly
People of the Kingdom of Cochin
Government Law College, Thiruvananthapuram alumni